The Minutes is a comedic play written by Tracy Letts. It had its premiere at the Steppenwolf Theater in Chicago on November 9, 2017, and began previews at the James Earl Jones Theatre in New York City on February 25, 2020. It was scheduled to open on March 15, 2020, but due to the COVID-19 pandemic, production was suspended. The production ultimately opened on April 17, 2022, at Studio 54.

In 2018, Letts was nominated for the Pulitzer Prize for Drama, losing to Cost of Living by Martyna Majok. The play was also nominated for the 2022 Tony Award for Best Play, but lost to The Lehman Trilogy.

Premise 
The show takes place in November and shows the inner-workings of a city council meeting in the fictional town of Big Cherry.

Production history

Chicago premiere 
The play premiered at the Steppenwolf Theatre in Chicago on November 9, 2017. The production was directed by Anna D. Shapiro and featured a cast made up of Ian Barford, Penny Slusher, Kevin Anderson, James Vincent Meredith, Cliff Chamberlain, William Petersen, Danny McCarthy, Brittany Burch, Francis Guinan, Sally Murphy, and Jeff Still. It featured design work from David Zinn (scenic), Ann Roth (costume), and Brian MacDevitt (lighting), André Pluess (sound), and Tom Watson (hair and wigs). The production closed on December 31, 2017, with plans to transfer the production to New York City.

2022 Broadway production 
The production transferred to the James Earl Jones Theatre and began previews on February 20, 2020. The design team and several members of the cast from the Chicago production signed on, though Slusher was replaced with Blair Brown, Chamberlain assumed Anderson's role and was replaced with Armie Hammer, Meredith was replaced with K. Todd Freeman, Petersen was replaced with Tracy Letts (also the playwright), Burch was replaced with Jessie Mueller, and Guinan was replaced with Austin Pendleton. The production planned to officially open on March 15, 2020, but, due to the COVID-19 pandemic, production was suspended indefinitely.

On November 16, 2020, the production unloaded from the James Earl Jones and announced that it would be moving to a different Broadway theater, with initial plans to open on March 15, 2022. In June 2021, it was reported that The Minutes would resume performances at Studio 54. It began previews on April 2, 2022, and officially opened on April 17. The entire cast from the 2020 previews returned except for Hammer, who was replaced by Noah Reid.

Notable casts

Awards and nominations

Original Chicago production

Original Broadway production

External links 
 Official website
 The Minutes on Internet Broadway Database

References 

2017 plays
Broadway plays
Comedy plays
Plays by Tracy Letts